Choi Gwang-geun (Korean:최광근) (born 3 December 1987) is a South Korean Paralympic judoka. He represented South Korea at the Summer Paralympics in 2012, 2016 and 2021 and he won three medals: the gold medal in the men's 100 kg event in 2012, the gold medal in the men's 100 kg event in 2016 and the bronze medal in the men's +100 kg event in 2021.

In 2018, he won the silver medal in the men's 100 kg event at the Asian Para Games held in Jakarta, Indonesia. He also won the gold medal in the men's team event.

References

External links 

 

Living people
1987 births
Place of birth missing (living people)
South Korean male judoka
Judoka at the 2012 Summer Paralympics
Judoka at the 2016 Summer Paralympics
Judoka at the 2020 Summer Paralympics
Medalists at the 2012 Summer Paralympics
Medalists at the 2016 Summer Paralympics
Medalists at the 2020 Summer Paralympics
Paralympic gold medalists for South Korea
Paralympic bronze medalists for South Korea
Paralympic medalists in judo
Paralympic judoka of South Korea
20th-century South Korean people
21st-century South Korean people